Chamical is a department of the province of La Rioja (Argentina).

Settlements
Bella Vista
Chamical
El Retamo
Esquina del Norte
Los Baldes
Polco

References 

Departments of La Rioja Province, Argentina